The following lists events that happened in 2014 in North Korea.

Incumbents
Premier: Pak Pong-ju
Supreme Leader: Kim Jong-un

Events

January 
 January 20 – Kenneth Bae, an American prisoner in North Korea, releases a message to the United States for help.

February 
 February 5 – North Korea and South Korea hold meetings to discuss visitation reunions of families separated by the Korean War.
 February 7 – The United Nations' commission of inquiry on human rights in the DPRK publishes a landmark report, which concludes that the DPRK's government is perpetrating "unspeakable atrocities" against its own people on a vast scale and committing “widespread, systematic and gross” violations that amount to crimes against humanity.
 February 10 – North Korea withdraws an invitation to a United States envoy to discuss the release of Kenneth Bae.
 February 11 – Talks between North Korea and the United States occur, with North and South Korea scheduled to start high-level talks the next day.
 February 15 – A North Korean cargo ship is allowed to leave the Panama Canal.
 February 17 – A United Nations report accuses North Korea of atrocities and calls for an investigation by the International Criminal Court.
 February 19 – Botswana ends diplomatic relations with North Korea following a UN report on the latter's human rights record.

March 
 March 3 – North Korea announces that it will release Australian Christian missionary John Short on account of his age.
 March 28 – South Korea captures a North Korean fishing boat that had crossed into their waters amid rising tensions between the two neighboring countries.
 March 31 – North and South Korea exchange artillery fire across sea boundaries.

April 
 April 4 – South Korea test-fires a new ballistic missile with a range of 500 kilometres and hopes to extend its range to 800 kilometres so that it can reach anywhere in North Korea.
 April 4 – A Mongolian-flagged cargo ship sinks off the coast of South Korea, with most of the 16 North Korean crew members reported missing.
 April 25 – North Korea announces that it has detained a 24-year-old US tourist, Matthew Todd Miller, for "rash behavior" during the immigration process.
 April 29 – North Korea warns South Korea that it will conduct live firing near the disputed maritime border.

May 
 May 9 – South Korea's Ministry of National Defense announces that three drones found in their territory came from North Korea.
 May 13 – An apartment block in Pyongyang containing 100 families collapses.
 May 18 – Officials report the collapse of a 23-story block of flats that is believed to have killed multiple residents, in a rare public apology.
 May 19 – An apartment building collapses in Pyongyang, with casualties estimated to be in the hundreds.
 May 22 – South Korean media reports that North Korea fired shells in a disputed area near a Republic of Korea Navy ship.

June 
 June 6 – North Korea announces that it arrested an American tourist last month for alleged inappropriate behavior.
 June 17 – North Korean propaganda videos show that they have developed a cruise missile similar to the Russian Kh-35 model.
 June 30 – North Korea says it will put on trial two American tourists, Jeffrey Fowle and Michael Miller, for crimes against the state.

July 
 July - A Russian-funded transshipment terminal in the northeastern port of Rajin.
 July 2 – South Korea reports that North Korea fired two short range missiles into the Pacific Ocean from the coastal city of Wonsan.
 July 3 – The government of Japan lifts some sanctions on North Korea following an agreement to re-investigate the fate of Japanese nationals abducted by North Korean agents in the 1970s and 1980s.
 July 9 – South Korea claims that North Korea has fired two short range missiles into the ocean to the east of the Korean Peninsula.
 July 13 – Japan's Defence Ministry claims that North Korea has fired two ballistic missiles into the Sea of Japan.
 July 14 – South Korea claims that North Korea has fired dozens of artillery shells into the sea near the disputed border.
 July 31 - The Carnegie Endowment for International Peace publishes a report pointing to the risk that the crisis in Ukraine could lead to selling defense technology in the black market that could advance the nuclear proliferation of North Korea.

September 
 September 14 – North Korea holds a trial for American tourist Matthew Todd Miller who was detained in April and sentences him to six years of hard labor.
 September 26 – North Korea acknowledges that Kim Jong-un is suffering from "discomfort", after a three-week absence from state media photographs.

October 
 October 7 – There is an exchange of gunfire as a North Korean patrol boat breaches the South Korean western sea border.
 October 13 – Kim Jong-un, the leader of North Korea makes his first public appearance in five weeks.
 October 21 – North Korea releases American Jeffrey Edward Fowle five months after detaining him for leaving a Bible at a hotel.

November 
 November 8 – North Korea releases American detainees Kenneth Bae and Matthew Todd Miller.
 November 13 – Cuba defends North Korea by circulating an amendment to a European-Japanese draft resolution recommending the referral of North Korea to the International Criminal Court for crimes against humanity.
 November 20 – North Korea threatens to conduct another nuclear test in response to a United Nations Human Rights Council resolution passed on Tuesday recommending the Security Council authorise a probe into human rights abuses.

December 
 December 2 – The FBI launches a probe into a massive hacking attack on Sony Pictures, believing the leadership of North Korea to be responsible.
 December 2 – South Korea approves a plan by the Christian Council of Korea to set up a large Christmas tree near the border with North Korea despite ongoing tensions.
 December 3 – Transparency International issues its 2014 Corruption Perceptions Index with Denmark achieving the highest rating and North Korea and Somalia tied with the lowest ranking.
 December 19 – A South Korean court orders the dissolution of the Unified Progressive Party citing pro-North Korean stances.
 December 20 – Sony Pictures Entertainment hack
 The North Korean government denies the U.S. Federal Bureau of Investigations's (FBI) accusation of involvement in hacking Sony's computers, asking the U.S. for a joint investigation and threatening "serious consequences" if the United States refuses the offer of cooperation.
 The United States rejects the offer from North Korea and then seeks help from China instead.
 December 22 – North Korea experiences severe internet outages.

Elections 
 2014 North Korean parliamentary election

References

Further reading

External links
"2014 Calendar Reveals Few Surprises" at Daily NK

 
North Korea
Years of the 21st century in North Korea
2010s in North Korea
North Korea